Fengzhuang is a station on Line 13 of the Shanghai Metro. It is located in Jiading District, Shanghai.

Although service did not include mobile or Wi-Fi signals, the metro did provide stops to five stations in Jiading District. , an infill station, is the next station travelling eastbound towards Zhangjiang Road and was opened on 15 June 2013.

External links

Notes 

Railway stations in Shanghai
Shanghai Metro stations in Jiading District
Railway stations in China opened in 2012
Line 13, Shanghai Metro